Matthew Louis Gaetz II (born May 7, 1982) is an American lawyer and politician who has served as the U.S. representative for  since 2017. The district includes portions of Walton County and all of Escambia, Okaloosa, and Santa Rosa counties. A member of the Republican Party, he is widely regarded as a staunch proponent of far-right politics as well as an ally of former president Donald Trump.

The son of prominent Florida politician Don Gaetz and grandson of North Dakota politician Jerry Gaetz, Gaetz was raised in Fort Walton Beach, Florida. After graduating from the William & Mary Law School, he briefly worked in private practice before running for state representative. He served in the Florida House of Representatives from 2010 until 2016, and received national attention for defending Florida's controversial "stand-your-ground law". In 2016, he was elected to the U.S. House of Representatives, and was reelected in 2018, 2020, and 2022.

Early life and career
Matthew Louis Gaetz II was born on May 7, 1982, in Hollywood, Florida, to Victoria (née Quertermous) and Don Gaetz, who later became a prominent local politician.

Gaetz grew up near Fort Walton Beach, and graduated from Niceville High School. He graduated from Florida State University in 2003 with a Bachelor of Science in interdisciplinary sciences, and from the William & Mary Law School in 2007 with a Juris Doctor. Gaetz was admitted to the Florida Bar on February 6, 2008.

Gaetz's father represented parts of Northwest Florida as a member of the Florida State Senate from 2006 to 2016, and was Senate president from 2012 to 2014. Gaetz's grandfather, Jerry Gaetz, was the mayor of Rugby, North Dakota, and a candidate for lieutenant governor of North Dakota at the 1964 North Dakota Republican Party state convention, where he died of a heart attack.

After graduating from William & Mary Law School, Gaetz worked at the law firm Keefe, Anchors & Gordon (now AnchorsGordon) in Fort Walton Beach. In October 2021, the Florida bar suspended Gaetz from practicing law due to unpaid fees.

Florida House of Representatives

In March 2010, after Republican state representative Ray Sansom's resignation on corruption charges in February 2010, Gaetz ran in the special election to succeed Sansom in the 4th district, which included southern Santa Rosa County and Okaloosa County. In a crowded Republican primary that included Craig Barker, Kabe Woods, Jerry G. Melvin, and Bill Garvie, Gaetz won with 43 percent of the vote. In the special general election, Gaetz defeated Democratic nominee Jan Fernald with 66 percent of the vote. During his campaign, Gaetz received almost $480,000 in contributions, about five times more than anyone else in the field, and almost 50 times more than Fernald, including $100,000 of his own money.

Gaetz was unopposed for a full term in 2010. In 2012, following the reconfiguration of Florida House of Representatives districts, Gaetz's district no longer contained any of Santa Rosa County. He was reelected unopposed in 2012 and 2014.

While serving in the state house, Gaetz and state senator Joe Negron proposed legislation that would hasten the execution of many inmates on Florida's death row by requiring the governor to sign a death warrant for those who had exhausted their appeals. He also joined state senator Greg Evers in proposing legislation to eliminate the federal ethanol content mandate that 10 percent of gasoline sold in Florida contain ethanol; Governor Rick Scott signed the legislation in May 2013.

Gaetz was one of two members to vote against a Florida bill against revenge porn in 2015, after having successfully blocked the bill previously.

Florida House speaker Will Weatherford announced that he would order hearings on the stand-your-ground law. Gaetz, the chairman of the Criminal Justice Subcommittee, was tasked with reviewing the legislation; he announced before hearings that he would not support changing "one damn comma", but said he would listen to both sides' testimony. After the hearings, he authored legislation to allow defendants who successfully used a stand-your-ground defense during trial to be able to expunge relevant information from their criminal records.

When his subcommittee was considering legislation that would keep suspects' mugshots off the Internet until their convictions, Gaetz brought up his 2008 arrest and non-conviction, arguing that his mistakes made him who he is and that publicly available mugshots "could be a problem for those unaccustomed to publicity".

In 2015, Gaetz supported the presidential campaign of Jeb Bush. Bush emailed Gaetz about introducing a bill to change the 2016 Florida Republican presidential primary to an earlier date in order to benefit Bush, Florida's former governor. Don Gaetz, then the president of the Florida Senate, also endorsed Bush, along with several other members of Florida's state legislature.

U.S. House of Representatives

Elections

In 2013, Gaetz announced that, in 2016, he would run for the 1st district State Senate seat held by his father, Don Gaetz, who was term-limited in 2016. On March 21, 2016, Gaetz withdrew from the race, choosing instead to run for the U.S. House seat representing Florida's 1st congressional district; the incumbent, Jeff Miller, had announced 11 days earlier that he would not seek reelection.

On August 30, 2016, Gaetz won the Republican primary with 35.7 percent of the vote to Greg Evers's 21.5 percent and Cris Dosev's 20.6 percent, along with five other candidates. This virtually assured Gaetz of victory in the general election; with a Cook Partisan Voting Index of R+22, the 1st is Florida's most Republican district, and one of the most Republican in the nation.

In the November 8 general election, Gaetz defeated Democratic nominee Steven Specht with 69 percent of the vote. He is only the seventh person to represent this district since 1933 (the district was numbered the 3rd before 1963).

Though a financial disclosure form Gaetz filed in 2016 showed a net worth of $388,000, he donated $200,000 of his own money to his congressional campaign. He also resigned from two Florida House political action committees he had started and chaired; the PACs closed down and transferred $380,000 to a federal super PAC, North Florida Neighbors, whose purpose was to support Gaetz's congressional campaign.

Tenure

On September 25, 2016, following the death of Miami Marlins pitcher José Fernández, Gaetz criticized the athletes protesting during the national anthem in a tweet.

Gaetz was listed as a member of the moderate Republican Main Street Partnership from at least January to June 2017.

Gaetz served as a top campaign adviser to Ron DeSantis during his 2018 gubernatorial campaign. He managed debate preparations and "drafted early administration organizational charts, helped steer early policy decisions and played a huge role in DeSantis' appointments", according to Politico.

In January 2018, Gaetz invited alt-right Holocaust denier Charles C. Johnson to attend Donald Trump's State of the Union address. Johnson previously raised money for the neo-Nazi website The Daily Stormer. Gaetz defended Johnson in an interview, saying that Johnson was neither a Holocaust denier nor a white supremacist.

In April 2019, Gaetz hired Darren Beattie as a speechwriter. Beattie had previously been fired as a speechwriter for the Trump administration after attending a conference associated with white nationalists.

Gaetz attended political rallies alongside members of the Proud Boys in 2018 and 2020.  
 
After the 2020 State of the Union Address, Gaetz filed an ethics complaint against Speaker of the House Nancy Pelosi, claiming she had committed a "flagrant violation of decorum" and perhaps broken the law by ripping up her copy of the speech.

In February 2020, Gaetz announced that he would no longer accept campaign contributions from federal political action committees.

On January 10, 2021, House Republican leader Kevin McCarthy complained on a phone call that Gaetz was unnecessarily "putting people in jeopardy", noting that the rioters at the U.S. Capitol on January 6 "came prepared with rope". The conversation was reported in April 2022.

In 2021, Gaetz and Georgia representative Marjorie Taylor Greene began a nationwide "America First Tour" on May 7, in The Villages, Florida. During the tour, Gaetz and Greene repeated debunked claims of fraud in the 2020 election, attacked Big Tech and, at one event, claimed that the Second Amendment was for "maintaining, within the citizenry, the ability to maintain an armed rebellion against the government, if that becomes necessary." As a consequence of the controversy the speakers had generated, their appearance at a conference site at Laguna Hills, in Orange County, California, was canceled.

In June 2021, Gaetz was one of 21 House Republicans to vote against a resolution to give the Congressional Gold Medal to police officers who defended the U.S. Capitol on January 6.

In February 2023, Gaetz invited Corey Ryan Beekman to lead the pledge of allegiance at a Judiciary Committee hearing. Beekman was charged with murder in 2019 in Michigan, and the victim's family criticized the invitation. Gaetz apologized to the family.

Ethics controversies
On February 26, 2019, the night before the scheduled public hearing of Michael Cohen, Trump's former personal attorney, before the House Oversight Committee, Gaetz directed a tweet to Cohen that implied without evidence that Cohen had had multiple extramarital affairs and also suggested his wife might be unfaithful while he was imprisoned due to new information disclosed to her. Other members of Congress saw the tweet as an attempt to intimidate a witness. Gaetz initially defended his tweet, saying it was part of "witness testing, not witness tampering" and "I don't threaten anybody." Asked to clarify, he said his "tweet speaks for itself". After sharp criticism from other members of Congress and an implicit rebuke by Speaker of the House Nancy Pelosi, Gaetz deleted the tweet and posted a tweet in which he apologized. Despite not being a member of the House Oversight Committee, Gaetz appeared at Cohen's hearing, saying that he wanted to observe and ask questions. During the hearing, U.S. Virgin Islands delegate Stacey Plaskett, a member of the Oversight Committee, recommended that Gaetz be referred to both the House Ethics Committee and criminal prosecutors for witness intimidation and tampering. After the hearing, Gaetz reportedly texted an apology to Cohen, who thanked him for it. The Florida Bar opened an investigation into Gaetz for the tweet, as did the House Ethics Committee. In August 2019, the Florida Bar announced it had found no probable cause that Gaetz had violated its rules.

In April 2020, Politico reported that Gaetz had spent nearly $200,000 of taxpayer funds renting an office from Collier Merrill, a Pensacola real estate developer and restaurateur and longtime friend, adviser, campaign donor, and legal client. Gaetz and Merrill separately told Politico that Gaetz paid below-market rent for the space, but Gaetz later said that the rent was "at or below market rate". House rules explicitly disallow below-market rentals, and require that parties to such leases "have [not] had, [n]or continue to have, a professional or legal relationship (except as a landlord and tenant)". On July 1, 2020, the Office of Congressional Ethics notified Gaetz it had terminated its review of the lease arrangements.

In July 2020, Politico reported that its investigation had found expenditures by Gaetz that appeared to violate the House ethics rules: spending tens of thousands of dollars for a speech-writing consultant and having a private company install a television studio in his father's home in Niceville, Florida, which Gaetz uses when he appears on television. Gaetz's office acknowledged that he spent $28,000 on speech-writing services, which is prohibited by House rules except in special circumstances and with prior approval from congressional officials, but said that it was a clerical error that it would fix. Of the television studio, Gaetz said that the company received $100 per month from his office, an amount not reported in his congressional spending records, and also charged television networks each time a network connected to the studio. A statement from Gaetz's office said the arrangement complied with House rules, and that during the setup process, his office consulted with the House Ethics Committee and the House Administration Committee.

In late February 2021, Gaetz and a dozen other Republican House members skipped votes and enlisted others to vote for them, citing the ongoing COVID-19 pandemic. But he and the other members were actually attending the Conservative Political Action Conference, which was held at the same time as their absences. In response, the Campaign for Accountability, an ethics watchdog group, filed a complaint with the House Committee on Ethics and requested an investigation into Gaetz and the other lawmakers.

In August 2022, Gaetz criticized President Joe Biden for forgiving up to $10,000 of student loan debt for eligible borrowers. Gaetz was criticized for hypocrisy because he had $476,000 of debt from his PPP loan forgiven.

2023 speakership election 
In the 2022 midterm elections, Republicans regained a narrow House majority. Although sitting Minority Leader Kevin McCarthy sought the speakership and had the support of 213 members, he needed five more votes to reach a majority to be elected. Certain members of the Freedom Caucus, including Gaetz, could contribute the required margin. Democrats held 212 votes, with one seat unfilled due to the November death of a holdover incumbent. The anti-McCarthy members withheld more than four votes through 14 ballots. They were thought to be holding out for substantial concessions regarding House rules and committee chair assignments. Their withholding of votes prevented McCarthy earning a majority of votes needed for the speakership. Thirteen months earlier, Gaetz had discussed with former President Trump the possibility of getting Trump elected to the speakership, for which House membership is not required. Gaetz nominated him once and voted for Trump on the 7th, 8th and 11th ballots. After midnight, January 7, on the 15th and last ballot, Gaetz switched his vote to "present", lowering the number of votes McCarthy needed and allowing him to win the speakership.

Committee assignments
 Committee on Armed Services
 Subcommittee on Oversight and Investigations
 Subcommittee on Tactical Air and Land Forces
 Committee on the Judiciary
 Subcommittee on Courts, Intellectual Property and the Internet
 Subcommittee on Regulatory Reform, Commercial and Antitrust Law

Caucus memberships
 Freedom Caucus
 Republican Study Committee

Political positions

Gaetz has self-identified as a "libertarian populist". Observers have described his views as far right. Gaetz was an early supporter of Donald Trump and his appeal to the Republican Party base, echoing his talking points. In several commercials during his 2016 congressional campaign, Gaetz promised to "kill Muslim terrorists and build the wall".

In a September 2022 episode of Steve Bannon's War Room podcast, Gaetz said that Republicans should prioritize "impeachment inquiries" against Democrats "to investigate them and to hold them accountable" if Republicans won the 2022 U.S. House of Representatives elections. He added, "it should be investigations [of Democrats] first—[and] policy, bill-making, to support the lobbyists and the PACs, as a far, far diminished priority."

Cannabis
Gaetz has introduced legislation to reclassify cannabis from Schedule I to Schedule III under the Controlled Substances Act. He has also introduced legislation to loosen federal restrictions on the cultivation of cannabis for research purposes. Gaetz has criticized the federal government for having "lied to the American people for a generation" about cannabis's medical benefits. As a member of the Florida House, he sponsored a bill, eventually signed into law, to expand the state's Right to Try Act to include the medical use of cannabis. In September 2017, Gaetz keynoted the American Medical Marijuana Physicians Association's annual conference.

In November 2019, Gaetz was one of only two Republicans on the House Judiciary Committee to vote for the Marijuana Opportunity Reinvestment and Expungement (MORE) Act, which among other reforms would remove cannabis from the Controlled Substances Act. He was also the only Republican cosponsor of the bill (of 55 cosponsors) at the time of its passage. Gaetz has introduced the STATES Act to prevent federal interference in states that have legalized cannabis for medical or recreational purposes. Gaetz has said he has had multiple conversations with President Trump about cannabis policy.

Donald Trump

On February 23, 2017, worried about protesters disrupting his appearance at his town hall in Pace, Florida, Gaetz prepared what his staffers called a nonverbal town hall. He printed out part of his speech onto giant boards that he would hold up if he was unable to speak. Gaetz arrived 30 minutes late to the meeting, where at least 500 constituents crowded into a bowling alley. At the meeting, he was questioned about his relationship with Trump, his stance on repealing the Affordable Care Act, and his proposal to abolish the Environmental Protection Agency. He said that Trump should release his tax returns, but stopped short of saying Congress should subpoena them. Gaetz closed his town hall by shouting Trump's 2016 campaign slogan, "Make America Great Again".

In April 2018, Politico called Gaetz "one of the most enthusiastic defenders of President Trump on cable news" and a "proud Trump protégé". Aaron Blake of The Washington Post called him one of Congress' "most controversial members", and one who has "unabashedly aligned himself with Trump on basically all things."

In May 2018, Gaetz was one of 18 House Republicans to vote to nominate Trump for the Nobel Peace Prize for his role in peace talks with North Korea.

Appearing on The View in February 2020, shortly before Trump associate Roger Stone was sentenced, Gaetz said he would support a pardon for Stone.

Gaetz is a member of the House Judiciary Committee, but not of the Intelligence, Foreign Affairs, or Oversight and Reform Committees, and so was not allowed to join lawmakers' closed-door deposition of former White House Russia aide Fiona Hill in October 2019. He told reporters that, since his committee oversees impeachment, he should have been allowed to be part of depositions related to the Trump impeachment inquiry.

On April 6, The New York Times reported that during the final weeks of Trump's presidency, Gaetz privately asked the White House for a blanket pardon for himself and some unknown congressional allies for any crimes they may have committed. The White House reportedly never seriously considered the request, because it was decided that issuing preemptive pardons would set a bad precedent. The Times also reported that aides had told Trump of the request. On April 7, Trump denied that Gaetz had asked him for a pardon and noted that Gaetz "totally denied the accusations against him". On April 8, it was revealed that Trump had reportedly wanted to defend Gaetz, but that his advisors talked him out of it due to the seriousness of the allegations.

Mueller investigation

In November 2017, Gaetz introduced a congressional resolution calling for Robert Mueller to recuse himself as special counsel because of what were said to be conflicts of interest. He also asked for a special counsel investigation into the Federal Bureau of Investigation's handling of the Hillary Clinton email controversy, undue interference by U.S. attorney general Loretta Lynch in the investigation, and the Russian state corporation Rosatom's acquisition of Uranium One during Mueller's time as FBI director. Gaetz said he did not trust Mueller to lead the investigation because of Mueller's alleged involvement in approval of the Uranium One deal and alleged close relationship with dismissed FBI director James Comey, a probable person of interest in a proposed new investigation.

After Ohio congressman Jim Jordan denied that he was aware of the sexual abuse of Ohio State University wrestlers during the period when Jordan was a coach there, Gaetz said that the allegations came from people in the "deep state" and were intended to reduce the credibility of Jordan's criticism of Mueller's investigation of the Trump campaign and Russia.

Gaetz said of then-U.S. attorney general Jeff Sessions that "over at the Department of Justice, he's got Stockholm syndrome, he's become sympathetic with his captors over there in the Deep State."

During Mueller's testimony to two congressional committees on July 24, 2019, Gaetz told him, "if Russians were lying to Christopher Steele to undermine our confidence in our newly elected president, that would be precisely in your purview because you stated in your opening that the organizing principle was to fully and thoroughly investigate Russian interference. But you weren't interested in whether the Russians interfered through Steele—and if Steele was lying, then you should have charged him with lying like you charged a variety of other people."

First impeachment of Donald Trump
In October 2019, Gaetz organized a "storming" of a Sensitive Compartmented Information Facility on Capitol Hill by about two dozen Republican congressmen, including House minority whip Steve Scalise, in an effort to sit in on and hear the deposition of a Pentagon official during the impeachment inquiry against Trump. The congressmens' cell phones and other devices put the secure facility, and U.S. national security, at risk.

One committee member said, "It was the closest thing I've seen around here to mass civil unrest as a member of Congress." House Homeland Security Committee chairman Bennie Thompson of Mississippi wrote to the House sergeant-at-arms about Gaetz and others, requesting that he take action regarding their "unprecedented breach of security". South Carolina's senior U.S. senator, Lindsey Graham, admonished the House members, calling them "nuts" for having made a "run on the SCIF." Ohio representative Jim Jordan said, "The members have just had it, and they want to be able to see and represent their constituents and find out what's going on." A day later, Jordan appeared on Fox News to justify the intrusion, saying of the chair of the committee: "Adam Schiff is doing this unfair, partisan process in secret and our members finally said, 'Enough'. We're so frustrated. They reached a boiling point and these guys marched in and said we want to know what's going on." In the 116th Congress, Pelosi, who is a committee member ex officio, appointed Schiff and 12 Democratic members of the House Intelligence Committee. House minority leader Kevin McCarthy, also an ex officio member, appointed the ranking member, Devin Nunes, and eight other Republicans to the committee. Each side got equal time to question witnesses. The disruption delayed Deputy Assistant Defense Secretary Laura Cooper's testimony by many hours.

Second impeachment of Donald Trump

On January 7, 2021, after Trump supporters violently broke into the U.S. Capitol, Gaetz falsely blamed anarchist movement Antifa for the attack, suggesting that rioters were "masquerading as Trump supporters".

Joel Valdez, a senior communications aide to Gaetz, posted a video on Parler hours before the storming of the Capitol with the caption "From the top of the Capitol office buildings, WE HEAR YOU LOUD AND CLEAR! #StopTheSteal". Gaetz voted against the second impeachment of Donald Trump.

Support for impeaching President Biden and Secretary Mayorkas

In August 2021, Gaetz co-sponsored a resolution by Andy Biggs to impeach Secretary of Homeland Security Alejandro Mayorkas. Later that month, Gaetz co-sponsored a resolution by Representative Marjorie Taylor Greene to impeach President Biden. In September 2022, he called impeaching Biden a "priority". He expressed the belief that many Republicans in Congress were hesitant to impeach Biden, but that Republican voters would feel "betrayed" if they did not. Very early into the 118th Congress, Gaetz cosponsored another resolution to impeach Mayorkas.

Economy
Gaetz voted for the Tax Cuts and Jobs Act of 2017. He acknowledged that the bill's pass-through tax deduction would benefit Trump, but added, "so many Americans benefit when commercial real estate becomes easier and more accessible."

Environment
In 2016, Gaetz acknowledged global warming but said he disagrees with the scientific consensus on climate change that human activity is the primary cause. In April 2017, the Center for American Progress and Vice Media said Gaetz was a climate change denier, citing his 2016 statements.

In January 2017, Gaetz proposed legislation to abolish the Environmental Protection Agency, claiming that it hurts small businesses via the costs associated with compliance.

In November 2017, Gaetz joined the bipartisan Climate Solutions Caucus. He said he advocated technological innovation and economic incentives that address climate change, and increased federal funds for global warming research by NASA, NOAA and universities, but remained opposed to increased environmental regulation.

In 2019, Gaetz introduced the bipartisan Super Pollutants Act, which aimed to slow climate change by regulating greenhouses gases, especially black carbon, hydrofluorocarbons, and methane. A press release stated, "These short-lived climate pollutants, also called super pollutants, are significantly more potent than carbon dioxide."

Foreign policy

Myanmar
In 2021, Gaetz was one of 14 House Republicans to vote against a measure condemning the Myanmar coup d'état that overwhelmingly passed, for reasons reported to be unclear.

Middle East
In June 2021, Gaetz was one of 49 House Republicans to vote to repeal the Authorization for Use of Military Force Against Iraq Resolution of 2002.

In December 2017, Gaetz supported Trump's decision to recognize Jerusalem as Israel's capital, and said that the move would pressure Palestine to recognize Israel.

In 2019, Gaetz was one of 60 representatives to vote against condemning Trump's withdrawal from Syria.

In April 2019, after the House passed a resolution withdrawing American support for the Saudi Arabian-led intervention in Yemen, Gaetz was one of nine lawmakers to sign a letter to Trump requesting a meeting with him and urging him to sign Senate Joint Resolution 7, which invokes the War Powers Act of 1973, to end unauthorized US military participation in the Saudi-led coalition's armed conflict against Houthi forces in Yemen.

In 2023, Gaetz was among 47 Republicans to vote in favor of H.Con.Res. 21, which directed President Joe Biden to remove U.S. troops from Syria within 180 days.

George Floyd protests
On June 1, 2020, during the nationwide George Floyd protests, Gaetz tweeted, "Now that we clearly see antifa as terrorists, can we hunt them down like we do those in the Middle East?" In response, Twitter hid the tweet and labeled it as "[violating] the Twitter Rules about glorifying violence". Gaetz called the label a "badge of honor", accused Twitter of enabling Antifa, and again said that "[o]ur government should hunt [Antifa] down".

On August 26, 2020, Gaetz tweeted "The mob wants to destroy America. We need PATRIOTS who will defend her" in support of Kyle Rittenhouse, a 17-year-old from Antioch, Illinois, who traveled to Kenosha, Wisconsin, and shot and killed two people and injured another claiming self-defense during the riots that occurred during the protests of the Jacob Blake shooting. Rittenhouse was arrested and charged with first-degree intentional homicide, but was acquitted based on self-defense in November 2021. Gaetz was one of three representatives to offer Rittenhouse a Congressional internship.

Gun policy
Former National Rifle Association president Marion Hammer called Gaetz "one of the most pro-gun members to have ever served in the Florida Legislature." Gaetz is a lifetime member of the NRA, and has an A+ rating from it.

When Gaetz served in the Florida House of Representatives, he led an unsuccessful effort to allow Floridians with concealed-weapons permits to carry those weapons openly in public. In lobbying for the bill, he said that the open carry of weapons was a right "granted not by government but by God." Gaetz supports Florida's stand-your-ground law and supported legislation that strengthened it against legal challenges. He also supports concealed carry reciprocity.

During a May 2021 "America First" rally with Marjorie Taylor Greene, Gaetz told an audience: "We have a Second Amendment in this country, and I think we have an obligation to use it!" He then said this meant allowing Americans "the ability to maintain an armed rebellion against the government if that becomes necessary." Immediately before his remarks on the Second Amendment, Gaetz criticized Big Tech companies for trying to "suppress us, discourage us", saying, "Silicon Valley can't cancel this movement, or this rally, or this congressman". As a result, Gaetz was accused of inciting violence against Silicon Valley employees, which he denied.

Health care
In October 2017, Gaetz claimed that the Medicaid expansion permitted by the Affordable Care Act fueled the opioid crisis. PolitiFact rated the claim "mostly false", noting that "experts were universal in saying that the evidence that Medicaid expansion is somehow fueling the opioid crisis doesn't exist."

In June 2021, Gaetz introduced the Digital Health Pass Prevention Act (DHPPA) with the support of representatives Louie Gohmert and Lance Gooden. The full title of the bill is "To prohibit Federal funds from being used to implement, administer, enforce, or carry out programs with respect to digital health passes, and for other purposes." It was sent to the House Committee on Energy and Commerce.

COVID-19
In early March 2020, Gaetz wore a gas mask during a House debate on funds to combat the COVID-19 pandemic. Gaetz has claimed that wearing the gas mask was not an act of mockery but a way of "demonstrating his concern". Several journalists characterized the decision as a stunt. A few days later, on March 9, Gaetz's office reported that he had been in contact with a Conservative Political Action Conference attendee who tested positive for COVID-19. As a result, Gaetz was placed under self-quarantine for 14 days. On March 10, he said his test was negative, but that he would stay under self-quarantine until the 14-day period ended on March 12.

On April 14, Gaetz said the Wuhan Institute of Virology "birthed a monster", a reference to the theory that COVID-19 was leaked out of a Chinese research lab. He also claimed that the National Institutes of Health had given the Institute a $3.7 million grant. The U.S.-based EcoHealth Alliance that worked with the Institute under a grant the Trump administration approved eventually had that funding withdrawn. but the EcoHealth Alliance later admitted that under the grant it had enhanced a bat coronavirus so it became potentially more infectious to humans, which the NIH said was an "unexpected result" of the research it had funded that was carried out in partnership with the Wuhan Institute of Virology. Nevertheless, the NIH denied it had helped create the virus that sparked the COVID-19 pandemic.

After Politico reported on November 7 that Gaetz had tested positive for COVID-19, he texted Politico "I have tested positive for antibodies" and "I have no live virus". He said he had no symptoms and was not sure when he had contracted the disease.

On December 4, 2020, Gaetz attended an indoor New York Young Republicans Club conference in Jersey City, New Jersey, during a period of surging COVID-19 cases throughout the state and the country. He was seen posing for photos in a crowd of unmasked attendees, prompting New Jersey governor Phil Murphy and Jersey City mayor Steven Fulop to publicly condemn him. Gaetz and other GOP members mocked Democrats and their COVID-19 regulations on social media. Murphy also said state officials were investigating whether the event violated the state's COVID-19 regulations.

After a contentious House committee hearing on June 10, 2021, Gaetz claimed a Chinese whistleblower possessed text messages and documents concerning COVID-19's origins that U.S government investigators had failed to pursue.

On July 31, Gaetz said of COVID-19 variants that "next it'll be the Chi Omega variant or the Pi Kappa Psi variant. I got the Florida variant. I got the freedom variant. It affects the brain. It gets you to think for yourself where you don't just surrender to the truth that they're trying to create in corrupt big media."

Abortion
Gaetz opposes abortion. On July 23, 2022, he gave a speech at a Student Action Summit gathering in Tampa, Florida, in which he said that overweight or unattractive women were unlikely to become pregnant and mocked them for supporting abortion rights, saying, "They're like 5'2", 350 pounds, and they're like, 'Give me my abortions or I'll get up and march and protest.'" A Texas teenager tweeted a post mocking Gaetz, who responded with a photo of her that, according to NPR, implied his comments had touched a nerve; she used the incident to raise over $2 million for abortion funds.

Human trafficking
On December 19, 2017, Gaetz was the only representative to vote against the Combating Human Trafficking in Commercial Vehicles Act, a bill allocating additional government resources to help combat human trafficking. Gaetz later explained that his vote was due to his small government principles and his belief that existing federal agencies could adequately combat human trafficking.

On February 27, 2018, Gaetz voted against the Allow States and Victims to Fight Online Sex Trafficking Act, which had by then been combined with the Stop Enabling Sex Traffickers Act. It passed, 388–25.

On July 26, 2022, Gaetz voted against the Frederick Douglass Trafficking Victims Prevention and Protection Reauthorization Act, which passed 401–20.

Immigration
Gaetz opposes sanctuary cities, which opt not to dedicate local law enforcement resources to prosecuting people solely for being undocumented. Upon announcing his run for Congress in 2016, he said that illegal immigrants were "sucking us dry." In January 2018, Gaetz defended a statement by Trump that reportedly said Haiti and African nations were "shithole" countries, saying that Haiti was covered by "sheet metal and garbage" and in "disgusting" condition.

In October 2018, Gaetz falsely claimed that George Soros paid for a caravan of migrants from Central America to the United States.

Gaetz voted against the Further Consolidated Appropriations Act of 2020 which authorizes DHS to nearly double the available H-2B visas for the remainder of FY 2020.

Gaetz voted against Consolidated Appropriations Act (H.R. 1158) which effectively prohibits ICE from cooperating with Health and Human Services to detain or remove illegal alien sponsors of unaccompanied alien children (UACs).

Gaetz has endorsed the white nationalist Great Replacement theory. In 2021, he called the Anti-Defamation League a "racist organization" after it condemned Tucker Carlson's promotion of Great Replacement theory. Gaetz said that Carlson "is CORRECT about Replacement Theory as he explains what is happening to America."

Law enforcement
On June 23, 2021, Gaetz tweeted that the FBI should be defunded while it is investigating him for alleged sex trafficking and having sex with a minor. He wrote, "If Democrats want to defund the police, they should start with the FBI." Gaetz later deleted the tweet. The week before, he claimed without evidence that "FBI operatives organized and participated in the January 6th Capitol riot."

LGBT rights
As a Florida state representative in 2015, Gaetz and Representative David Richardson sponsored an amendment to repeal Florida's ban on same-sex adoptions. He also persuaded his father, in the Florida State Senate, to support the repeal.

After the U.S. Supreme Court decided Obergefell v. Hodges in 2015, legalizing same-sex marriage nationwide, Gaetz said he disagreed with the court's ruling. He said each state should have the right to decide for itself whether to allow same-sex marriage. He claimed that the decision was an example of "judicial activism" that posed "a threat to our democracy".

During the 116th Congress, Gaetz voted against the Equality Act.

In 2022, Gaetz voted against the Respect for Marriage Act.

Big Tech
In 2022, Gaetz was one of 39 Republicans to vote for the Merger Filing Fee Modernization Act of 2022, an antitrust package that would crack down on corporations for anti-competitive behavior.

Legal issues

Driving offenses
In 2008, Gaetz was arrested for driving under the influence as he was driving back from a nightclub on Okaloosa Island, Florida. Police recorded him driving  in a  zone and noted that he showed physical signs of intoxication. Gaetz initially denied that he had drunk alcohol, but later admitted to drinking two beers. He failed an eye test twice, then declined field sobriety tests. After Gaetz was arrested, he refused to take a breathalyzer test.

Shortly after Gaetz's case was referred to state attorney Steve Meadows, Gaetz's driving license was reinstated. Though Florida law requires a year's suspension when a driver refuses a breathalyzer test, Gaetz's suspension was less than a year long. His refusal also did not lead to a criminal prosecution, during which it could have been used against him. A field officer for the Florida Department of Highway Safety and Motor Vehicles declared there was no evidence that Gaetz refused a breathalyzer test, despite the arresting police officer having documented it in an affidavit and the arrest report and Gaetz's own attorney also having documented it. Gaetz's attorney also claimed that an unnamed witness who knew Gaetz "observed no indication of impairment". The charges against Gaetz were dismissed.

Federal investigations into sex trafficking
In January 2020, the U.S. Secret Service reportedly received a tip that, in April 2018, Gaetz had accompanied Seminole County tax collector Joel Greenberg to a government office where Greenberg was producing fake IDs. Greenberg was indicted in August 2020 on an array of charges, including sex trafficking a 17-year-old girl in 2017 and creating fake IDs to facilitate sex trafficking. The investigation of Greenberg led federal officials to look into some of Gaetz's related activities. In late 2020, the Justice Department opened its investigation of Gaetz for allegedly sex trafficking the same 17-year-old girl in 2017 and whether he had violated federal sex trafficking laws by paying her to travel with him across state lines. As part of his plea bargain, Greenberg cooperated with the investigation of Gaetz and others.

On March 30, 2021, Axios reported that Gaetz was "seriously considering not seeking re-election and possibly leaving Congress early for a job at Newsmax". The same day, The New York Times reported the Justice Department's investigation of Gaetz. According to CNN, a person briefed on the matter said investigators also examined whether Gaetz used campaign money in his relationships with young women for travel and expenses and whether cash and drugs were involved. By April 2, the Justice Department was examining whether Gaetz asked women to recruit others for sex.

According to the 2021 reports, federal investigators were looking into Gaetz's September 2018 trip to the Bahamas. Gaetz was reportedly joined by marijuana entrepreneur and hand surgeon Jason Pirozzolo, who allegedly paid trip accommodations, traveling expenses, and escort services. Investigators were reportedly exploring whether the escorts were sexually trafficked for Gaetz and whether Gaetz accepted paid escorts in exchange for political access or legislative favors for Pirozzolo, who at the time chaired the board of the Medical Marijuana Physicians Association. Gaetz made two speeches for the organization while in Congress, and Pirozzolo gave two separate donations of $1,000 to Gaetz's campaign arm "Friends of Matt Gaetz", in March 2016 and May 2017. A spokeswoman for Gaetz denied the new allegations. A woman on the Bahamas trip—a Capitol Hill intern who did not work in Gaetz's office but who was dating Gaetz—reportedly agreed in May 2021 to cooperate with investigators, who believe she has information about Gaetz's financial transactions on the trip.

Investigators believe that Greenberg met women through a website for sex and introduced them to Gaetz, who also had sex with them. Evidence including mobile payment receipts reportedly suggesting Gaetz had illegally exchanged money for sex, such as May 2018 Venmo transaction records showing Gaetz sending $900 (with a memo referring to a woman) to Greenberg, who then relayed the money (with the memos "tuition" and "school") to three women, one of whom was 18. Joseph Ellicott, an associate of both Gaetz and Greenberg, pleaded guilty in January 2022 to two charges related to this investigation and is also cooperating with authorities.

Gaetz had argued in a November 2020 Fox News appearance that Trump "should pardon Michael Flynn [and] everyone from himself to his administration officials to Joe Exotic". In late 2020, Greenberg apparently attempted to secure a pardon from the Trump administration via a confession letter (first reported by The Daily Beast in April 2021), writing that he and Gaetz had had sex with a 17-year-old girl they believed was 19, and that payments had been made on behalf of Gaetz to her and other women in exchange for sex. Greenberg attempted to bribe Roger Stone with a $250,000 Bitcoin payment to secure a presidential pardon, texting Stone, "They know [Gaetz] paid me to pay the girls and that he and I both had sex with the girl who was underage." By the end of the Trump administration, Greenberg was under indictment, investigators had been questioning some Gaetz associates, and federal agents had seized the phone of one of Gaetz's former girlfriends. Gaetz's phone was also seized, and he changed his phone number in late December.

Defense and counter-claim of extortion
Denying any sexual relationships with minors, Gaetz said on March 30, 2021, that he did not plan to resign from the House. Also on March 30, he tweeted that he and his family were "victims of an organized criminal extortion involving a former DOJ official seeking $25 million". This allegedly began on March 16, with a text message to his father demanding money in exchange for making sex trafficking allegations "go away". Gaetz and his father purportedly received communications claiming that the FBI had photographs of Gaetz engaged in a "sexual orgy with underage prostitutes". The sender demanded millions of dollars to help secure the release of U.S. federal agent Robert Levinson (who had disappeared in Iran in 2007 and had already been presumed and declared dead), proposing that President Joe Biden would pardon Gaetz as a reward for freeing Levinson. The sender was later identified as Florida developer Stephen Alford, who was arrested on August 31.

Gaetz said his attorneys contacted the FBI, which he said informed them that Gaetz was a subject, not a target, of an investigation. He also said his father agreed to wear a "wire" to help the FBI record the alleged extortionists. Gaetz sent Axios screenshots of text messages, emails and documents outlining the alleged extortion scheme, which he asserted was being run by David McGee, a former federal prosecutor who has been a private attorney since 2005 and has represented the Levinson family. McGee's law firm called Gaetz's allegation "completely, totally false" and defamatory, telling The Daily Beast that Gaetz was attempting to distract from the sex trafficking investigation. Alford, who has previously been federally convicted of fraud and is represented by McGee, was federally indicted in August 2021 for allegedly conducting the scheme. Prosecutors alleged that Alford claimed he had contacts in the Justice Department who could arrange for a presidential pardon for Gaetz and directed Don Gaetz to wire the money to a trust account managed by McGee. McGee reportedly met with Don Gaetz before Alford did, but apparently did not discuss a presidential pardon, which Alford later admitted to the FBI that he had lied about his ability to arrange.

Also on March 30, Tucker Carlson interviewed Gaetz on Fox News. In addition to denying the allegations about his relationship with a 17-year-old girl, Gaetz denied a previously unreported claim that he had been photographed "with child prostitutes", and said that a friend of his (whom Carlson had supposedly met) had been urged by the FBI to claim Gaetz was "involved in some pay-for-play scheme". He also argued that "Providing for flights and hotel rooms for people that you're dating who are of legal age is not a crime."

Response and other developments
On March 31, 2021, House Minority Leader Kevin McCarthy said he had no plans to remove Gaetz from his seats on the Judiciary and Armed Services Committees, but that he might change his mind if Gaetz "gets indicted" or "if it comes out to be true."

On April 1, 2021, CNN reported that Gaetz had shown pictures of naked women to colleagues on the House floor. Gaetz had allegedly claimed to have slept with the women in the photos. The next day, his communications director, Luke Ball, and his legislative director, Devin Murphy, resigned. Both had begun working for Gaetz when he joined Congress in 2017.

On April 6, 2021, The New York Times reported that in the last weeks of the Trump administration, Gaetz privately requested a blanket presidential pardon for himself and others, which was reportedly denied because it would set a bad precedent. The next day, Trump publicly denied that Gaetz had asked him for a pardon. On April 8, it was revealed that Trump had reportedly wanted to defend Gaetz but was told to stand down due to the seriousness of the allegations.

On April 8, 2021, Gaetz's congressional office released a statement purportedly from his female employees vouching for his character, stating they "uniformly reject these allegations as false". Gaetz's new communications director, Joel Valdez, told Forbes that "all of the office's eight female staffers signed it", but the version of the statement that was released did not have anyone's signature or identify any specific employee. That evening, Representative Adam Kinzinger tweeted that Gaetz should resign, becoming the first congressional Republican to make such a call.

On April 9, 2021, the House Ethics Committee opened an investigation into allegations that Gaetz "may have engaged in sexual misconduct and/or illicit drug use, shared inappropriate images or videos on the House floor, misused state identification records, converted campaign funds to personal use, and/or accepted a bribe, improper gratuity, or impermissible gift".

In late April, Gaetz fundraised to run his own political ads, claiming that he was under attack by powerful interests such as "big government, big tech, big business, big media" that perceived him as a political threat. A public-relations firm hired by Gaetz issued a denial statement regarding The Daily Beast's reporting on Greenberg's correspondence implicating him and Gaetz.

On May 17, 2021, Greenberg pleaded guilty to multiple crimes in a plea deal in which he would have to cooperate with prosecutors.

By June, the federal investigation had reportedly broadened to include obstruction of justice, relating to a phone conversation Gaetz had with a witness. Later in June, ABC News reported that the investigation had engulfed many in the Central Florida political scene and that prosecutors could decide whether to bring charges against Gaetz as early as July. In August, ABC News reported that Greenberg had "provided investigators with years of Venmo and Cash App transactions and thousands of photos and videos, as well as access to personal social media accounts." These include September 2018 text messages between Greenberg and a woman engaging in prostitution, which indicate that a prostitute was arranged for Gaetz and that the drug MDMA may have been proffered. A spokesperson for Gaetz said, "not one woman has come forward to accuse Rep. Gaetz of wrongdoing" and that Gaetz had "addressed the debunked allegations against him" on his new podcast, Firebrand. According to Greenberg, he made the arrangements for Gaetz.

Two top Washington prosecutors—a public corruption investigator with an expertise in child exploitation crimes and a leader of the public corruption unit—have worked on Gaetz's case since at least mid-2021. Greenberg's sentencing hearing was originally scheduled for August 2021, but due to his cooperation in related investigations, had been repeatedly delayed. In January 2022, an ex-girlfriend of Gaetz's testified before a grand jury after being granted immunity; she reportedly had information relevant to two of three criminal charges being considered for Gaetz: sex trafficking a minor and obstruction of justice. (A year later, her attorney said that Justice Department prosecutors made the right decision not to charge Gaetz because "they didn’t have evidence to prove a crime".) Gaetz was also accused of violating the Mann Act, which prohibits sex trafficking across state lines. Later in January 2022, Joseph Ellicott confessed that in 2017, he witnessed Greenberg telling Gaetz over the phone that the woman they had both had sex with was underage.

On December 1, 2022, thanks to his assistance with the prosecutors in a series of investigations, including those involving Gaetz, Greenberg was sentenced to 11 years in prison, plus ten years of supervised release. The sentencing judge, Gregory A. Presnell, said, "He has provided substantial cooperation to the government...more than I've seen in 22 years."

Conclusion of Investigation 

A September 2022 Washington Post article reported that prosecutors have recommended not to charge Gaetz in the sex-trafficking investigation, telling Justice Department superiors that a conviction is unlikely in part because of credibility questions about the two central witnesses. In February 2023 the DOJ communicated to the attorneys for Gaetz that they had concluded their investigation and would not be leveraging charges against him, effectively ending a multiyear probe including allegations of misconduct.

Firebrand
Gaetz has a 2020 book and a 2021 podcast, both titled Firebrand. In both, he criticizes former House Speaker Paul Ryan for joining the board of Fox News's parent company and blames him for canceling Lou Dobbs Tonight. In the book, while discussing dating in Washington, he writes, "I knew going in how many people had been brought down by sexual missteps in this town, so I set some rules to help me err on the safe(r) side ... [including] no dating your staff members, [etc.]."

Personal life
In June 2020, following an argument with then-Representative Cedric Richmond, Gaetz said he had been living with a 19-year-old immigrant from Cuba, Nestor Galbán, since Galbán was 12, and considered Galbán his son. He later clarified that Galbán is the brother of an ex-girlfriend of Gaetz's and that Galbán spends time with his sister, with Gaetz's family, and with Gaetz. The two are not related genetically or legally. Gaetz said, "Our relationship as a family is defined by our love for each other, not by any paperwork." In 2016, he called Galbán a "local student"; in 2017, he called Galbán "my helper".

In December 2020, Gaetz announced his engagement to his girlfriend, Ginger Luckey, the sister of Oculus VR founder and major Republican donor Palmer Luckey. They married in August 2021.

See also
Neo-nationalism
Radical right (United States)
Right-wing populism

References

External links

 Congressman Matt Gaetz official U.S. House website
 Campaign website
 
 

|-

1982 births
21st-century American politicians
American critics of Islam
American nationalists
American people of Norwegian descent
American people of German descent
Far-right politicians in the United States
Florida lawyers
Florida State University alumni
Living people
People from Fort Walton Beach, Florida
People from Hollywood, Florida
Republican Party members of the Florida House of Representatives
Republican Party members of the United States House of Representatives from Florida
Right-wing populism in the United States
William & Mary Law School alumni